Chulipuram is a village in Jaffna District, Sri Lanka. Its area is 7.5 km2. It is located about 16 kilometers north-west of Jaffna town along the Karainagar-Manipay-Jaffna road AB17.

The Victoria College, Chulipuram is the main icon of Chulipuram.

References

Villages in Jaffna District
Valikamam West DS Division